Heldman is a surname. Notable people with the surname include:

Alan Heldman (born 1962), American interventional cardiologist
Dennis R. Heldman (born 1938), food engineer
Gladys Heldman (1922–2003), the founder of World Tennis magazine
Julie Heldman (born 1945), American tennis player

See also
Heldmann